Barmer is a city and municipal council in the Barmer district in the state of Rajasthan, India. It is the administrative headquarters of Barmer district. It is a Group 'C' city for living standards, and the headquarters of the Barmer tehsil, Rajasthan.

Demographics
As of the 2011 Census, Barmer had a population of 100,051. The population of the 0-6 year age range was 22% of the total population. Barmer had an average literacy rate of 56.53%; gender-wise, 70% of males and 30% of females are literate.

Religion

Geography
This district is spread across an area of 28,387 km2 . Barmer district is the third largest district of Rajasthan State. This district is famous for its vegetation like khejari, ber, ker,  sangari and anar ( promegrante ). It is located between 24°58' and 26°32' N and between 70°05' and 72°52' E.  The district forms a part of the Thar desert and is situated in the western part of the State.

Climate

References
https://barmer.rajasthan.gov.in/content/raj/barmer/en/about-barmer/geographical-and-physical-features.html#:~:text=Spread%20across%20an%20area%20of,western%20part%20of%20the%20State.

External links
 Everywhere magazine article about Barmer
Barmer District official website
Barmer at Rajasthan Tourism Website.

 
Cities and towns in Barmer district
Barmer district
Former capital cities in India